Irapuato is a Mexican city (and municipality) located at the foot of the Arandas Hill (in Spanish: Cerro de Arandas), in the central region of the state of Guanajuato. The city is the second-largest in the state (only behind León), with a population of 342,561 according to the 2005 census, while its municipality has a population of 529,440. Although it is now an important center for regional trade and transportation center as well the site of several automotive and chemical manufacturing plants, the city's main industry has historically been agriculture and it has long been known for its strawberries and the raising of pigs and cattle. The fruits and flowers of Irapuato's luxurious gardens are well known throughout Mexico.

History

Prehispanic era
In the pre-Hispanic era, the site was inhabited by the Chichimecas (c. 1200 AD), a group of semi-nomadic hunter-gatherers. Later on, the Purépechas conquered the region and initiated the establishment of a permanent settlement. They constructed buildings in the Purépecha architectural style, produced pottery, and practiced agriculture. They called the settlement Xiriquitzio (or Iriquitzio), which the Spanish conquerors pronounced "Jiricuato" (or Jiricuicho), which meant "the place with houses (or low dwellings)". The initial growth period, however, was short-lived. The downfall of the Purépecha Empire led to the abandonment of the settlement, at which point it was once again inhabited by the Chichimecas.

Conquest
In the 16th century, vasts amounts of silver ore were discovered at the present day site of the capital city of Guanajuato. This discovery led to a massive migration of Spanish settlers to the area.

Flood
Many people were left stranded on roofs and high places for days before they were rescued.

Massacres
[[Mass shooting narco morena
]]s occurred at drug rehabilitation centers on 6 June and 1 July 2020.

Climate
The large majority of rainfall occurs from June - September.

Transportation

Airport

Irapuato is a 2 or 3 hour flight from cities including Los Angeles, Houston, Dallas, Mexico City, Monterrey, Guadalajara and Puerto Vallarta, among others. Located just 25 minutes from the city of Irapuato the Del Bajío International Airport (its correct name is Aeropuerto Internacional de Guanajuato (Guanajuato International Airport)) (IATA: BJX) is an international airport located in Silao, close to Irapuato, Guanajuato, Mexico. It handles national and international air traffic of the area that includes the cities of León, Irapuato, and the state capital, Guanajuato. Guanajuato International Airport is an important connecting point for some flights from Mexico City to the United States.

Major highways
Major highways in Irapuato and their starting and ending points:

 Mexican Federal Highway 45 Ciudad Juárez, Chihuahua - Panales, Hidalgo
 Mexican Federal Highway 90 Irapuato, Guanajuato - Zapotlanejo, Jalisco
 Mexican Federal Highway 43 Salamanca, Guanajuato - Morelia, Michoacán
 Mexican Federal Highway 110 Armería, Colima - Xoconostle, Guanajuato

Education
The city of Irapuato is home to some private universities including catholic University of the Incarnate Word, and a single public university, the Higher Technological Institute of Irapuato (ITESI).

The city is also home to a research center of the Center for Advanced Research and Studies (CINVESTAV) specializing in plant biotechnology and genetics and the newly created National Center of Plant Genomics.

Sport
The local football team is Irapuato FC.

Stadiums and arenas
Estadio Sergio Leon Chavez
Plaza de Toros
Parque Irekua
Golf Club Santa Margarita

Notable people
 Don Fernando Barba Amezcua – Philanthropist dedicated to the preservation of indigenous traditions and cultures through the Pacha Moma Cultural Space 
 Amalia Macías – singer and actress who toured Europe
 Enrique del Moral – architect.
 Silvia Navarro – actress.
 Natalia Guerrero – actress.
 Carolina Miranda - actress.
 Carlos Cordero – athlete for Mexico at the 2012 London Olympics.
 Samuel Ruiz – Catholic prelate.
 Mario Castañeda – Mexican voice actor.
 Chucho Navarro – founding member of the Trio Los Panchos.
 Miguel Ángel Chico Herrera – president of PRI from 2005 to 2009.
 Roberto Alvarado – professional soccer player who plays for Cruz Azul in the Liga MX, and the Mexico National Team.
 Claudio González – professional soccer player who plays for Club Leon in the Liga MX.
 Óscar Razo – professional soccer player who played for Club Atlas in the Liga MX.
 Francisco Rotllán – professional soccer player who played for Mexico at the 1992 Summer Olympics in Barcelona.
 Sergio Ávila – professional soccer player who played for Chivas de Guadalajara and the Mexico U-23 national team.
 José Antonio Patlán – professional soccer player who played for Chivas de Guadalajara in 2006
 Juan Zaragoza – soccer player

Images

Sister cities
 Aguascalientes, Aguascalientes, Mexico
 Green Bay, Wisconsin, United States
 Houston, Texas, United States
 Chula Vista, California, United States
 Laredo, Texas, United States
 Marianao, Havana, Cuba
 McAllen, Texas, United States
 Murcia, Murcia,  Spain

References

External links

D IRAPUATO.COM SPANISH
Presidencia Municipal de Irapuato Official website
Irapuato Article on Wikipedia Español

 
Municipalities of Guanajuato
Populated places established in 1547
Populated places in Guanajuato